The Fermi paradox, named after Italian-American physicist Enrico Fermi, is the apparent contradiction between the lack of evidence for extraterrestrial civilizations and various high estimates for their probability.

Music

Albums
 Fermi Paradox (Tub Ring album), 2002
 Fermi Paradox (Ronn McFarlane & Carolyn Surrick album), 2020

Songs
 "Fermi Paradox", a 2011 song by Hank Green from Ellen Hardcastle
 "Fermi Paradox", a 2016 song by Avenged Sevenfold from The Stage

Books
 The Fermi Paradox Is Our Business Model, a 2010 science fiction by Charlie Jane Anders